Cerodrillia arubensis is a species of sea snail, a marine gastropod mollusc in the family Drilliidae.

Description
The length of the shell varies between 7 mm and 8 mm.

Distribution
This marine species occurs off Aruba.

References

 Fallon P.J. (2016). Taxonomic review of tropical western Atlantic shallow water Drilliidae (Mollusca: Gastropoda: Conoidea) including descriptions of 100 new species. Zootaxa. 4090(1): 1–363

External links
 

arubensis
Gastropods described in 2016